Philomastiginae is a subfamily of sawflies in the family Pergidae. There are at least four genera and six described species in Philomastiginae.

Genera
These four genera belong to the subfamily Philomastiginae:
 Cerospastus Konow, 1899
 Ecopatus Smith, 1990
 Philomastix Froggatt, 1890
 Philoperra Smith, 1995

References

Tenthredinoidea